The 2005–06 Umaglesi Liga was the seventeenth season of top-tier football in Georgia. It began on 30 July 2005 and ended on 9 May 2006. Dinamo Tbilisi were the defending champions.

Locations

League standings

Results

Relegation play-offs

Top goalscorers

See also
2005–06 Pirveli Liga
2005–06 Georgian Cup

References
Georgia - List of final tables (RSSSF)

Erovnuli Liga seasons
1
Georgia